The 2014 Arab Cup U-20 was normally the third edition of the Arab Cup U-20. The tournament hosted by Qatar and was planned to be played between 2 and 15 June 2014, however because the 2014 FIFA World Cup, it was reported to a date between 25 December 2014 and 5 January 2015. And finally, it was definitively cancelled by the Union of Arab Football Associations.

The draw for the tournament took place on April 29, 2014, in Doha, Qatar.

Participants

References

Arab
International association football competitions hosted by Qatar
Arab Cup U-20
Arab
2014 in youth association football